Steiner's problem, asked and answered by , is the problem of finding the maximum of the function

 

It is named after Jakob Steiner.

One can determine that by solving the equivalent problem of maximizing 

 

 

References

Functions and mappings
Mathematical optimization